Holger Wick (born 12 September 1962) is a German former biathlete. He competed in the 20 km individual event at the 1984 Winter Olympics.

References

External links
 

1962 births
Living people
German male biathletes
Olympic biathletes of East Germany
Biathletes at the 1984 Winter Olympics
People from Gotha (town)
Sportspeople from Thuringia